The 1978 Ohio State Buckeyes football team represented the Ohio State University in the 1978 Big Ten Conference football season. The Buckeyes compiled a 7–4–1 record, including the 1978 Gator Bowl in Jacksonville, Florida, where they lost, 17–15, to the  Clemson Tigers. This would be Woody Hayes' last season as head coach of the team, as he was fired following an incident in the game in which he punched Clemson defender Charlie Bauman.

Schedule

Personnel

Depth chart

Game summaries

Penn State

    
    
    
    
    

Art Schlichter started the game at quarterback while Rod Gerald, the starter for the two previous seasons, opened the game at split end.

Minnesota

Baylor

SMU

Purdue

Iowa

Northwestern

Wisconsin

Illinois

at Indiana

Ricky Johnson played in place of the injured Ron Springs and Calvin Murray
Woody Hayes' last victory as Ohio State's head coach

Michigan

Gator Bowl (vs. Clemson)

1979 NFL draftees

References

Ohio State
Ohio State Buckeyes football seasons
Ohio State Buckeyes football